Price Blackwood, 4th Baron Dufferin and Claneboye (6 May 1794 – 21 July 1841) was the third and eldest surviving son of Hans Blackwood, 3rd Baron Dufferin and Claneboye and his first wife Mehetabel Hester Temple, daughter of Robert Temple.

He was a captain in the Royal Navy and married on 4 July 1825 Helen Selina Sheridan, daughter of Thomas Sheridan, himself the eldest son of the playwright and statesman Richard Brinsley Sheridan, and had issue:

Frederick Temple Hamilton-Temple-Blackwood, 5th Baron Dufferin and Claneboye

Lord Dufferin died from an accidental overdose of morphine and was succeeded by his only son. Helen Lady Dufferin was married secondly after his death to George Hay, Earl of Gifford (1822–1862), the eldest son of George Hay, 8th Marquess of Tweeddale on 13 October 1862 on his deathbed. Lady Dufferin died on 13 June 1867.

Arms

References

1794 births
1841 deaths
Barons in the Peerage of Ireland
Royal Navy officers
Price
Accidental deaths in Ireland
Clandeboye